Saint Felix of Como (died on October 8, 391 AD) is venerated as the first bishop of Como.

He was a friend of Saint Ambrose, who praised him for his missionary activity and ordained him a priest in 379 and a bishop in 386. When Bassianus of Lodi built a church dedicated to the Apostles at Lodi, he consecrated it in the presence of Ambrose and Felix. 

Felix is honored as a zealous pastor of souls. His feast day is July 1.

References

External links
Saint of the Day, July 14: Felix of Como  at SaintPatrickDC.org

Saints from Roman Italy
Bishops of Como
4th-century Italian bishops
391 deaths
4th-century Christian saints
Year of birth unknown